Samuel Walker (June 25, 1825 – June 9, 1881) was an American politician from Pennsylvania. He served as mayor of Tallahassee, Florida, in the state legislature, Leon County Court judge, and as a U.S. Senator.

Walker's parents were John and Ann (McNeal) Walker. He was born in Londonderry township, Chester County, Pennsylvania, June 25, 1825.

The family removed to Downington, Pa., in 1836, whence he entered Yale College in 1850; having acquired the greater part of his preparation while working at his trade as a wheelwright. After graduation in 1854, he entered the service of the United States Coast Survey, and from 1859 to 1866 had charge of the Magnetic Observatory at Key West, Florida.  The series of magnetic observations being ended, he resigned on May 15, 1866, receiving the highest encomiums for his labors from the Department.

He immediately entered upon the practice of law, having previously prepared himself and been admitted to the bar in 1864.  On June 18, 1866, he was appointed prosecuting attorney in the County Criminal Court at Key West. In 1867, he removed to Tallahassee, where he remained for the rest of his life. He enjoyed the confidence and respect of his fellow-citizens, and was elected member of the Florida Legislature and mayor of Tallahassee. He was also appointed by the Governor of the State as Judge of the Leon County Court. In 1874 he was the choice of the majority of the Republican members of the Legislature for U.S. Senator.

During the autumn of 1876 he had a stroke of paralysis, and he was a sufferer from nervous debility ever after. Relinquishing his profession, he passed the most of his time on a small plantation which he had purchased for his amusement some time before. In May 1881, he went North to visit his relatives, and arrived in Downington just a month before his death, which occurred at his sister's house in that town, June 9, 1881, at the age of 55.  Walker was never married.

References

1825 births
1881 deaths
Yale College alumni
People from Chester County, Pennsylvania
United States Coast Survey personnel
Florida state court judges
Mayors of Tallahassee, Florida
Members of the Florida House of Representatives
19th-century American politicians
19th-century American judges